Pyrola is the second studio album by Swedish progressive rock band Qoph. The album was released in Sweden and Germany in 2004 and in Japan by Disk Union in 2005. The Japanese edition includes the bonus track "Anticipations" with Mats Öberg (Mats/Morgan Band) guesting on moog. The double vinyl version contains two more bonustracks: "Resh" and "Will the Sun Be Back Tomorrow.

Track listing

Personnel
 Robin Kvist - vocals
 Filip Norman - guitar
 Federico de Costa - drums
 Patrik Persson - bass

Guest musicians
 Joakim Svalberg - clavinet and moog, (on "Stand My Ground")
 Mats Öberg - moog and vocals, (on "Korea")
 Nicklas Barker - mellotron, (on "Moontripper" and "Korea")
 Simon Steensland - theremin, (on "Travel Candy")
 Per Wikström - percussion
 Dennis Berg - electronic bite alarm, (on "Half of Everything")

Production
 Per Wikström - engineer

References

2004 albums
Qoph (band) albums